Balic Winery is a winery in the Mays Landing section of Hamilton Township in Atlantic County, New Jersey. The vineyard was first planted in the early 19th century by descendants of the original settlers of Mays Landing. Balic is the third-oldest active winery in the state, after Renault Winery and Tomasello Winery, having opened in 1966. Balic is one of the largest winegrowers in New Jersey, having 57 acres of grapes under cultivation. The winery is named after its founder.

Wines
Balic Winery is in the Outer Coastal Plain AVA, and produces wine from Cabernet Franc, Cabernet Sauvignon, Chambourcin, Chardonnay, Chenin blanc, Pinot noir, Riesling, Sangiovese, Vidal blanc, Viognier, Vranac, and Zinfandel grapes. Balic also makes fruit wines from almonds, blackberries, blueberries, cherries, cranberries, mangoes, pomegranates, raspberries, and strawberries. It is the only winery in New Jersey that produces wine from Vranac, which is a red vinifera grape indigenous to Montenegro. Balic is best known for its signature pomegranate wine, and they advertise the medical benefits from antioxidants in pomegranate wine.

Licensing, associations, and outlets
Balic has a plenary winery license from the New Jersey Division of Alcoholic Beverage Control, which allows it to produce an unrestricted amount of wine, operate up to 15 off-premises sales rooms, and ship up to 12 cases per year to consumers in-state or out-of-state. Balic is not a member of the Garden State Wine Growers Association or the Outer Coastal Plain Vineyard Association. The winery operates outlet stores in five New Jersey towns Clinton, Denville, Vernon, Vineland and Clark.

See also
Alcohol laws of New Jersey
American wine
Judgment of Princeton
List of wineries, breweries, and distilleries in New Jersey
New Jersey Farm Winery Act
New Jersey Wine Industry Advisory Council
New Jersey wine

References

Wineries in New Jersey
Tourist attractions in Atlantic County, New Jersey
1966 establishments in New Jersey
Hamilton Township, Atlantic County, New Jersey